Oleksiy Zbun (born 9 June 1997) is a professional Ukrainian football midfielder who plays for Sūduva.

Career
Zbun is a product of Brovary youth sport school system. He continued his career in the amateur club Shpolatekhahro from Shpola in Cherkasy Oblast, but in July 2015 signed contract with FC Zirka Kirovohrad.

He made his debut for FC Zirka as a substituted player in the second half-time in the match against FC Dnipro on 1 April 2017 in the Ukrainian Premier League.

References

External links
 
 
 

1997 births
Living people
Sportspeople from Zhytomyr Oblast
Ukrainian footballers
Association football midfielders
Ukrainian expatriate footballers
Ukrainian expatriate sportspeople in Belarus
Expatriate footballers in Belarus
Ukrainian expatriate sportspeople in Lithuania
Expatriate footballers in Lithuania
Ukrainian Premier League players
Ukrainian First League players
A Lyga players
FC Zirka Kropyvnytskyi players
FC Torpedo Minsk players
FC Hirnyk-Sport Horishni Plavni players
FC Hirnyk Kryvyi Rih players
FC Džiugas players
FK Sūduva Marijampolė players